The Derby de la Garonne (Garonne Derby) is a football match contested between French clubs FC Girondins de Bordeaux and Toulouse FC. The derby is so-named because Bordeaux and Toulouse are the two major cities in south-western France, both which are situated on the Garonne River. The consistency and competitiveness of the rivalry developed following Toulouse's return to Ligue 1 after being administratively relegated to the Championnat National in 2001.

Notable matches the teams contested include a 3–1 victory for Toulouse on the final day of the 2006–07 season which placed Toulouse in third place, which gave the club a qualification spot in the following year's UEFA Champions League. The following season, Bordeaux recorded a 4–3 victory over Toulouse at home. Bordeaux initially took a 3–0 lead into halftime on two goals from Wendel and one from Alou Diarra. However, in a span of 14 minutes in the second half, striker Johan Elmander of Toulouse converted a hat trick to even the match at 3–3. Four minutes from then, Wendel netted the game-winning goal. The match also was notable due in part to referee Bertrand Layec's issuing of nine yellow cards.

The Derby de la Garonne can also refer to matches involving local clubs within the city of Toulouse. Local amateur clubs such as Blagnac FC, Toulouse Rodéo, Balma SC, and Toulouse Fontaines contest similar Derby de la Garonne matches.

Summary of results

Honours

Table correct as of 5 February 2020

References

External links
  Toulouse FC Official Site
  FC Girondins de Bordeaux Official Site

French football derbies
Toulouse FC
FC Girondins de Bordeaux
Football in Occitania (administrative region)
Football in Nouvelle-Aquitaine
Recurring sporting events established in 1946
1946 establishments in France